Therrien, Therien or Thérien, may refer to:

People
Césaire Thérien (1824 – 1890), a merchant and political figure in Quebec, Canada
Olaüs Thérien (1860 – 1929), a lawyer, editor and political figure in Quebec, Canada
Joseph Edward Therrien (1879 – 1954), an American businessman and politician
Gaston Therrien (1960), a retired Canadian professional ice hockey player
Michael Therien, Profess of chemistry at Duke University
Michel Therrien (1963),  head coach of the Montreal Canadiens of the National Hockey League
Jean-François Therrien (1969), a politician from Quebec, Canada
Chris Therien (1971), a retired Canadian professional ice hockey defenceman
Alain Therrien(1966), a Canadian politician
Jesen Therrien (1993), Canadian former baseball player

Places
Therien, Alberta, a hamlet in Alberta, Canada